Seyvan can refer to:

 another name for Sagban, Iran
 Seyvan, Yenice, Turkey